Montech is a commune in the Tarn-et-Garonne department in the Occitanie region in southern France.

On the Canal de Garonne is the unique Montech water slope, a type of canal inclined plane built in 1974. The slope has been out of service since an engine failure in 2009.

Population

Monuments

See also
Communes of the Tarn-et-Garonne department
André Abbal

References

Communes of Tarn-et-Garonne
Languedoc